The J.E. Wise Building is a historic building in Nogales, Arizona. It was built in 1916, and designed in the Chicago school architectural style. The editorial staff of the Nogales Herald newspaper moved into the building in 1918. It has been listed on the National Register of Historic Places since August 29, 1985.

References

National Register of Historic Places in Santa Cruz County, Arizona
Chicago school architecture in the United States
Commercial buildings completed in 1916
1916 establishments in Arizona